Katharine Stewart BEM (29 August 1914 in Reading, England – 27 March 2013 in Inverness) was an English author, crofter, teacher and postmistress.

Stewart is best known for her book A Croft in the Hills. First published in 1960, it describes the life of a family in a remote croft in the 1950s. The book has been republished and reprinted seven times. She has also written A Garden In The Hills, A School In The Hills and The Post in the Hills.

Awards
She was awarded:
 The British Empire Medal for services to the community.
 A Saltire Society Award for her contribution to the understanding of Scottish Highland culture.

References

1914 births
2013 deaths
People from Reading, Berkshire
Recipients of the British Empire Medal
English women novelists
20th-century English women writers
20th-century English novelists